Winthrop is the remnant of a lunar impact crater that has been flooded by lava from the Oceanus Procellarum. It was named after American astronomer John Winthrop. It lies across the western rim of the much larger crater Letronne, a much larger feature that has been nearly destroyed by the intruding mare lavas. All that survives of Winthrop are a few segments of the outer rim.

Winthrop was previously identified as Letronne P before being renamed by the IAU.

References

 
 
 
 
 
 
 
 
 
 
 

Impact craters on the Moon